Michael A. Paradiso is an American neuroscientist, currently the Sidney A. Fox and Dorothea Doctors Fox Professor and Founding Director of the Center for Vision Research at Brown University.

References

Year of birth missing (living people)
Living people
Brown University faculty
American neuroscientists
Brown University alumni
Pomona College alumni